Granatstein is a surname. Notable people with the surname include: 

Jack Granatstein (born 1939), Canadian historian
Solly Granatstein, American television producer and director
Yechiel Granatstein (1913–2008), Polish-born Jewish author